Nicholas (Nicky)Furlong (born 1929 died 21 March 2022) was an Irish farmer, journalist, author and historian from County Wexford.

Personal life
Nicholas Furlong was born in Wexford in 1929. He became a dairy farmer on the family farm at Mulgannon. His father also owned a Pub, located on Wexford town's main street. For many years he wrote a satirical column for the People Group under the pen name "Pat O'Leary" and wrote regular features in The Irish Press, the Farmers Journal and Biatas (journal to the Irish Sugar Company). He is currently a columnist with Echo Group Newspapers.

He was also a member of the Royal Society of Antiquaries of Ireland.

He died on 21 March 2022 after a short illness.

Education
He attended St Peter's College, Wexford, the Salesian Agricultural College, Warrenstown, County Meath, and University College Dublin (UCD).

Works
He has written such books as: 
Wexford in the Rare Oul' Times (with John Hayes). Numerous Volumes - consisting primarily of early photographs of County Wexford. Volume 1 was published in 1985.
A History of County Wexford. Dublin: Gill & MacMillan, 2003. .
Foster Son to a King. Dublin: Children's Press, 1986.
Fr John Murphy of Boolavogue 1753–1798. Dublin: Geography Publications, 1991. .
The Greatest Hurling Decade. Dublin: Wolfhound Press, 1993.
Diarmait: King of Leinster. Cork: Mercier Press, 2006. . This is a biography of Dermot Mac Murrough, an edition previously published as Dermot, King of Leinster, and the foreigners. Tralee, Co. Kerry: Anvil Books, 1973.
"Young Farmer Seeks Wife". Dublin: Merlin Mercier, 2002. This was his first novel.

Nicholas Furlong has also written for the stage, his plays including: Insurrection '98, The Lunatic Fringe, Purple and Gold, and Storm the Bastille which was produced by Harry Ringwood and first performed in Abbey Square, Enniscorthy, in July 1989.

References and footnotes

Sources
Furlong, Nicholas. Fr John Murphy of Boolavogue 1753–1798. Dublin: Geography Publications, 1991). .
Furlong, Nicholas. A History of County Wexford. Dublin: Gill & MacMillan, 2003. .

External links
Nicholas Furlong's website

1929 births
Living people
People from County Wexford
Irish writers
People educated at St Peter's College, Wexford